The Warwickshire flag is the flag of the historic county of Warwickshire in England. It was registered with the Flag Institute in August 2016. The flag was registered as a result of a campaign that secured the support of a dozen county organisations plus the sanction of both the Lord Lieutenant and the High Sheriff.



Design

The design features the traditional bear and ragged staff used in the county since the Middle Ages as a symbol of the Earls of Warwick. The first recorded use of the two symbols was by the Beauchamp family, who became the Earls of Warwick in 1268, as a seal. They were initially used separately, and the earliest known appearance of them together was on a bed of black cloth embroidered with a gold bear and silver staff owned by Thomas de Beauchamp, 12th Earl of Warwick (1338–1401). The bear and ragged staff appear in the same arrangement as the flag in John Speed's 1611 map of the county.

The current holders of the title of Earl of Warwick, the Greville family, were granted the symbol of their predecessors, a "bear erect argent, muzzled gules, supporting a ragged staff of the first", shortly after being given the title in 1759. This crest is still used by the earls today. Over the centuries, however, the design has also become associated with the wider county. For example, the 1st Warwickshire Militia regiment, first raised in 1759, used the symbol. Many other organisations in the county followed in adopting the bear and ragged staff, including Warwickshire Constabulary (established in 1857) and Warwickshire County Council (established in 1889). The design of the flag lacks the chains and the muzzle on the bear, commonly found in old depictions of the emblem.

References

External links
[ Flag Institute particulars]
Background on the Warwickshire flag

2016 establishments in England
Warwickshire
Warwickshire
Flag
Flag
Warwickshire
Warwickshire